The City College of the City University of New York (also known as the City College of New York, or simply City College or CCNY) is a public research university within the City University of New York (CUNY) system in New York City. Founded in 1847, City College was the first free public institution of higher education in the United States. It is the oldest of CUNY's 25 institutions of higher learning and is considered its flagship college.

Located in Hamilton Heights overlooking Harlem in Manhattan, City College's 35-acre (14 ha) Collegiate Gothic campus spans Convent Avenue from 130th to 141st Streets. It was initially designed by renowned architect George B. Post, and many of its buildings have achieved landmark status. The college has graduated ten Nobel Prize winners, one Fields Medalist, one Turing Award winner, three Pulitzer Prize winners, and three Rhodes Scholars. Among these alumni, the latest is a Bronx native, John O'Keefe (2014 Nobel Prize in Medicine). City College's satellite campus, City College Downtown in the Cunard Building at 25 Broadway, has been in operation since 1981. It offers degree programs for working adults with classes in the evenings and Saturdays.

Other primacies at City College that helped shape the culture of American higher education include the first student government in the nation (Academic Senate, 1867); the first national fraternity to accept members without regard to religion, race, color or creed (Delta Sigma Phi, 1899); the first degree-granting evening program (School of Education, 1907); and, with the objective of racially integrating the college dormitories, "the first general strike at a municipal institution of higher learning" led by students (1949). The college has a 48% graduation rate within six years. It is classified among "R2: Doctoral Universities – High research activity".

History

Early 19th century 

The City College of New York was founded as the Free Academy of the City of New York in 1847 by wealthy businessman and president of the Board of Education Townsend Harris. A combination prep school, high school / secondary school and college, it would provide children of immigrants and the poor access to free higher education based on academic merit alone.  It was one of the early public high schools in America following earlier similar institutions being founded in Boston (1829),
Philadelphia (1838), and Baltimore (1839).

The Free Academy was the first of what would become a system of municipally-supported colleges – the second, Hunter College, was founded as a women's institution in 1870; and the third, Brooklyn College, was established as a coeducational institution in 1930.

In 1847, New York State Governor John Young had given permission to the state Board of Education to found the Free Academy, which was ratified in a statewide referendum. Founder Townsend Harris proclaimed, "Open the doors to all… Let the children of the rich and the poor take their seats together and know of no distinction save that of industry, good conduct and intellect."

Dr. Horace Webster (1794–1871), a United States Military Academy at West Point graduate, was the first president of the Free Academy. On the occasion of The Free Academy's formal opening, January 21, 1849, Webster said:

The experiment is to be tried, whether the children of the people, the children of the whole people, can be educated; and whether an institution of the highest grade, can be successfully controlled by the popular will, not by the privileged few.

In 1847, a curriculum was adopted which had nine main fields: mathematics, history, language, literature, drawing, natural philosophy, experimental philosophy, law, and political economy. The Academy's first graduation took place in 1853 in Niblo's Garden Theatre, a large theater and opera house on Broadway, near Houston Street at the corner of Broadway and Prince Street.

Even in its early years, the Free Academy showed tolerance for diversity, especially in comparison to its urban neighbor, Columbia College, which was exclusive to the sons of wealthy families. The Free Academy had a framework of tolerance that extended beyond the admission of students from every social stratum. In 1854, Columbia's trustees denied distinguished chemist and scientist Oliver Wolcott Gibbs a faculty position because of Gibbs's Unitarian religious beliefs. Gibbs was a professor and held an appointment at the Free Academy since 1848. (In 1863, Gibbs went on to an appointment at Harvard College, the Rumsford Professorship in Chemistry, where he had a distinguished career. In 1873, he was awarded an honorary degree from Columbia with a unanimous vote by its Trustees with the strong urging of Columbia president Frederick Augustus Porter Barnard.) Later in the history of CCNY, in the early 1900s, President John H. Finley gave the college a more secular orientation by abolishing mandatory chapel attendance. This change occurred at a time when more Jewish students were enrolling in the college.

Late 19th century 

In 1866, the Free Academy, a men's institution, was renamed the College of the City of New York. In 1929, the College of the City of New York became the City College of New York.  Finally, the institution became known as the City College of the City University of New York when the CUNY name was formally established as the umbrella institution for New York City's municipal-college system in 1961.  The names City College of New York and City College, however, remain in general use.

With the name change in 1866, lavender was chosen as the college's color. In 1867, the academic senate, the first student government in the nation, was formed. Having struggled over the issue for ten years, in 1895, the New York state Legislature voted to let the City College build a new campus. A four-square block site was chosen, located in Manhattanville, within the area which was enclosed by the North Campus Arches; the college, however, quickly expanded north of the Arches.

Like President Webster, the second president of the newly renamed City College was a West Point graduate.  The second president, General Alexander S. Webb (1835-1911), assumed office in 1869, serving for almost the next three decades.  One of the Union Army's heroes at Gettysburg, General Webb was the commander of the Philadelphia Brigade.  In 1891, while still president of the City College, he was awarded the Congressional Medal of Honor for heroism at Gettysburg.  A full-length statue of Webb, in full military uniform, stands in his honor at the heart of the campus.

The college's curriculum under Webster and Webb combined classical training in Latin and Greek with more practical subjects like chemistry, physics, and engineering. One of the outstanding Nineteenth Century graduates of City College was the Brooklyn-born George Washington Goethals, who put himself through the college in three years before going on to West Point. He later became the chief engineer on the Panama Canal project (1903–1914) with one of the excavation cuts named for him. General Webb was succeeded by John Huston Finley (1863–1940), as third president in 1903. Finley relaxed some of the West Point-like discipline that characterized the college, including compulsory religious chapel attendance.

Phi Sigma Kappa placed its sixth oldest chapter on the campus in 1896, flourishing until 1973, and whose alumni still provide scholarships to new students entering the CCNY system.

Delta Sigma Phi was founded at CCNY in 1899 as a social fraternity based on the principle of the brotherhood of man. It was the first national organization of its type to accept members without regard to religion, race, color or creed. The chapter flourished at the college until 1932 when it closed as a result of the Great Depression. The founding of another national fraternity, Zeta Beta Tau, took place at City College in December 1898 by Dr. Richard Gottheil who aimed at establishing a Jewish fraternity with Zionist ideals. This chapter, however, has become defunct.

Early 20th century
Education courses were first offered in 1897 in response to a city law that prohibited the hiring of teachers who lacked a proper academic background. The School of Education was established in 1921. The college newspaper, The Campus, published its first issue in 1907, and the first degree-granting evening session in the United States was started.

Separate Schools of Business and Civic Administration and of Technology (Engineering) were established in 1919. Students were also required to sign a loyalty oath. In 1947, the college celebrated its centennial year, awarding honorary degrees to Bernard Baruch (class of 1889) and Robert F. Wagner (class of 1898). A 100-year time capsule was buried in North Campus.

Until 1929, City College had been an all-male institution. During that time, specifically in 1909, the first chapter of Sigma Alpha Mu fraternity was founded. In 1930, CCNY admitted women for the first time, but only to graduate programs. In 1951, the entire institution became coeducational.

In the years when top-flight private schools were restricted to the children of the Protestant establishment, thousands of brilliant individuals (including Jewish students) attended City College because they had no other option. CCNY's academic excellence and status as a working-class school earned it the titles "Harvard of the Proletariat", the "poor man's Harvard", and "Harvard-on-the-Hudson".

Even today, after three decades of controversy over its academic standards, no other public college has produced as many Nobel laureates who have studied and graduated with a degree from a particular public college (all graduated between 1935 and 1963). CCNY's official quote on this is "Nine Nobel laureates claim CCNY as their Alma Mater, the most from any public college in the United States." This should not be confused with Nobel laureates who teach at a public university; UC Berkeley boasts 19. Many City College Alumni also served in the U.S. Armed Forces during the Second World War (1939/41–1945). A total of 310 CCNY alumni were killed in the War. Prior to World War II, a large number of City College alumni—relative to alumni of other U.S. colleges—volunteered to serve on the Republican side in the Spanish Civil War (1936–1939). Thirteen CCNY alumni were killed in Spain.

In its heyday of the 1930s through the 1950s, CCNY became known for its political radicalism. It was said that the old CCNY cafeteria in the basement of Shepard Hall, particularly in alcove 1, was the only place in the world where a fair debate between Trotskyists and Stalinists could take place. Being part of a political debate that began in the morning in alcove 1, Irving Howe reported that after some time had passed he would leave his place among the arguing students in order to attend class. When he returned to the cafeteria late in the day, he would find that the same debate had continued but with an entirely different cast of students. Alumni who were at City College in the mid-20th century said that City College in those days made the famous radicalism at the University of California at Berkeley in the 1960s look like a school of conformity.

The municipality of New York was considerably more conformist than CCNY students and faculty. The Philosophy Department, at the end of the 1939/40 academic year, invited the British mathematician and philosopher Bertrand Russell to become a professor at CCNY. Members of the Roman Catholic Church protested Russell's appointment. A woman named Jean Kay filed suit against the state Board of Higher Education to block Russell's appointment on the grounds that his views on marriage and sex would adversely affect her daughter's virtue, although her daughter was not a CCNY student. Russell wrote "a typical American witch-hunt was instituted against me." Kay won the suit, but the Board declined to appeal after considering the political pressure exerted. Also see The Bertrand Russell Case.

Russell took revenge in the preface of the first edition of his book An Inquiry into Meaning and Truth, which was published by the Unwin Brothers in the United Kingdom (the preface was not included in the U.S. editions). In a long précis that detailed Russell's accomplishments including medals awarded by Columbia University and the Royal Society and faculty appointments at Oxford, Cambridge, UCLA, Harvard, the Sorbonne, Peking (the name used in that era), the LSE, Chicago, and so forth, Russell added, "Judicially pronounced unworthy to be Professor of Philosophy at the College of the City of New York."

Late 20th century 
In 1945, Professor William E. Knickerbocker, Chairman of the Romance Languages Department, was accused of anti-semitism by four faculty members. They claimed that "for at least seven years they have been subjected to continual harassment and what looks very much like discrimination" by Knickerbocker. Four years later Knickerbocker was again accused of anti-semitism, this time for denying honors to high-achieving Jewish students. About the same time, Professor William C. Davis of the Economics Department was accused by students of maintaining a racially segregated dormitory at Army Hall. Professor Davis was the dormitory's administrator. CCNY students, many of whom were World War II veterans, launched a massive strike in protest against Knickerbocker and Davis. The New York Times called the event "the first general strike at a municipal institution of higher learning." Also see the Knickerbocker Case.

In 1955, a City College student named Alan A. Brown founded the economics honor society, Omicron Chi Epsilon. The purpose of the society was to confer honors on outstanding economics students, organize academic meetings, and publish a journal. In 1963, Omicron Chi Epsilon merged with Omicron Delta Gamma, the other economics honor society, to form Omicron Delta Epsilon, the current academic honor society in economics.

As student radicalism increased in the late 1960s, with the Civil Rights Movement and anti-Vietnam War feelings increased. culminating at CCNY during a 1969 protest takeover of the South campus, under threat of a riot, African American and Puerto Rican activists and their white allies demanded, among other policy changes, that the City College implement an aggressive affirmative action program to increase minority enrollment and provide academic support. At some point, campus protesters began referring to CCNY as "Harlem University." The administration of the City University at first balked at the demands, but instead, came up with an open admissions or open-access program under which any graduate of a New York City high school would be able to matriculate either at City College or another college in the CUNY system. Beginning in 1970, the program opened doors to college to many who would not otherwise have been able to attend college. The increased enrollment of students, regardless of college preparedness, however, challenged City College's and the university's academic reputation and strained New York City's financial resources.

City College began charging tuition in 1976. But after three decades, by 1999, the CUNY Board of Trustees voted to eliminate remedial classes at all CUNYs senior colleges, thereby eliminating a central pillar of the policy of Open Admissions and effectively ending it. Students who could not meet the academic entrance requirements for CUNY's senior colleges were forced to enroll in the system's community colleges, where they could prepare for an eventual transfer to one of the 4-year institutions. Since this decision, all CUNY senior colleges, especially CCNY, have begun to rise in prestige nationally, as evinced by school rankings and incoming freshman GPA and SAT scores. In addition, the end of open admissions sparked a change in CUNY's student demographics, with the number of Black and Hispanic students decreasing and the number of White Caucasian and Asian students increasing.

As a result of the 1989 student protests and building takeovers concerning tuition increases, a community action center was opened on the campus called the Guillermo Morales/Assata Shakur Community and Student Center, located in the NAC building. The center was named after CUNY alumni Assata Shakur and Guillermo Morales, both of whom are now in exile in Cuba. Students and neighborhood residents who used the center for community organizing against issues of racism, police brutality, and the privatization and militarization of CUNY faced constant repression or opposition from the City College administration for years. After a long controversy, on October 20, 2013, City College seized the Guillermo Morales/Assata Shakur Community and Student Center in the middle of the night, provoking a student demonstration.

CCNY's new Frederick Douglass Debate Society defeated 
Harvard and Yale at the "Super Bowl" of the American Parliamentary Debate Association in 1996. In 2003, the college's Model UN Team was awarded as an Outstanding Delegation at the National Model United Nations (NMUN) Conference, an honor that it would repeat for four years in a row.

The U.S. Postal Service issued a postcard commemorating CCNY's 150th anniversary, featuring Shepard Hall, on Charter Day, May 7, 1997.

21st century

The City University of New York began recruiting students for the University Scholars program in the fall 2000, and admitted the first cohort of undergraduate scholars in the fall 2001. CCNY was one of five CUNY campuses, on which the program was initiated. The newly admitted scholars became undergraduates in the college's newly formed Honors Program. Students attending the CCNY Honors College are awarded free tuition, a cultural passport that admits them to New York City cultural institutions for free or at sharply reduced prices, a notebook computer, and an academic expense account that they can apply to such academic-related activities as study abroad. These undergraduates are also required to attend a number of specially developed honors courses. In 2001 CUNY initiated the CUNY Honors College, renamed Macaulay Honors College in 2007. Both the CCNY Honors Program and the CCNY chapter of the Macaulay Honors College are run out of the CCNY Honors Center.

In October 2005, Dr. Andrew Grove, a 1960 graduate of the Engineering School in Chemical Engineering, and co-founder of Intel Corporation, donated $26 million to the Engineering School, which has since been renamed the Grove School of Engineering. It is the largest donation ever given to the City College of New York.

In August 2008, the authority to grant doctorates in engineering was transferred from the CUNY Graduate Center to City College Grove School of Engineering.

In 2009, the School of Architecture moved into the former Y Building, which was gutted and completely remodeled under the design direction of architect Rafael Viñoly. Also in 2009, school was renamed the Bernard and Anne Spitzer School of Architecture in honor of the $25 million gift the Spitzers gave to the school.

On July 1, 2018, the authority to grant doctorates in clinical psychology was transferred from the CUNY Graduate Center to City College.

On December 13, 2021, the Board of Trustees voted to accept a gift of $180,000 cash mailed by an anonymous donor, to be directed to funding two full tuition scholarships each year for at least ten years.

Presidents
 Horace Webster, 1847–1869
 General Alexander S. Webb, 1869–1902
 John Huston Finley, 1903–1913
 Sidney Edward Mezes, 1914–1927
 Frederick B. Robinson, 1927–1938
 Nelson P. Mead 1938–1941
 Harry N. Wright, 1941–1952
 Buell G. Gallagher, 1953–1961, 1962–1969
 Harry N. Rivlin, (acting) 1961–1962
 Joseph J. Copeland, (interim) 1969–1970
 Robert Marshak, 1970–1979
 Alice Chandler, (interim) 1979–1980
 Arthur Tiedemann, (interim) 1980–1981
 Bernard W. Harleston, 1981–1992
 Augusta Souza Kappner, (interim) 1992–1993
 Yolanda T. Moses, 1993–1999
 Stanford A. Roman Jr., (interim) 1999–2000
 Gregory H. Williams, 2001–2009
Robert "Buzz" Paaswell, (interim) 2009–2010
 Lisa S. Coico, 2010–2016
 Vincent G. Boudreau, (interim) 2016–2017
 Vincent G. Boudreau, 2017–Present

Campuses

North Campus
CCNY's Collegiate Gothic campus in Manhattanville was erected in 1906, replacing a downtown campus built in 1849. This new campus was designed by George Browne Post. According to CCNY's published history, "The Landmark neo-Gothic buildings [...] are superb examples of English Perpendicular Gothic style and are among the first buildings, as an entire campus, to be built in the U.S. in this style. Groundbreaking for the Gothic Quadrangle buildings took place in 1903". There were five original neo-Gothic buildings on the upper Manhattan campus, which opened in 1906:

 Shepard Hall, standing on its own, across the street from the campus quadrangle on Convent Avenue
 Baskerville Hall
 Compton Hall
 Harris Hall
 Wingate Hall

Shepard Hall, the largest building and the centerpiece of the campus, was modeled after a Gothic cathedral plan with its main entrance on St. Nicholas Terrace. It has a large chapel assembly hall called the Great Hall, which has a mural painted by Edwin Blashfield called "The Graduate" and another mural in the Lincoln Hallway commissioned by the class of 1901 called "The Great Teachers" painted by Abraham Bogdanove in 1930. The building was named after Edward M. Shepard. One of Ernest Skinner's earliest organs was installed in the Great Hall in the early 1900s.

Baskerville Hall for many years housed the Chemistry Department, was also known as the Chemical Building, and had one of the largest original lecture halls on the campus, Doremus lecture hall. It currently houses HSMSE, The High School for Mathematics, Science, and Engineering.

Compton Hall was originally designed as the Mechanical Arts Building.

Harris Hall, named in the original architectural plans as the Sub-Freshman Building, housed City College's preparatory high school, Townsend Harris High School, from 1906 until it moved in 1930 downtown to the School of Business.

Wingate Hall was named for George Wood Wingate (Class of 1858), an attorney and promoter of physical fitness. It served as the college's main gymnasium between 1907 and 1972.

The sixth campus, Goethals Hall, was completed in 1930. The new building was named for George Washington Goethals, the CCNY civil engineering alumnus who, as mentioned above in the section on the history of the college, went on to become the chief engineer of the Panama Canal. Goethals Hall housed the School of Technology (engineering) and adjoins the Mechanical Arts Building, Compton Hall.

The six Gothic buildings are connected by a tunnel, which closed to public use in 1969. Six hundred grotesques on the original Gothic buildings represent the practical and the fine arts.

The North Campus Quadrangle contains four great arches on the main avenues entering and exiting the campus:
 the Hudson Gate on Amsterdam Avenue
 the George Washington Gate at 138th Street and Convent Avenue
 the Alexander Hamilton Gate at the northern edge of Convent Avenue
 the Peter Stuyvesant Gate at St. Nicholas Terrace. (The Archway and north pedestrian arch over the north side of St. Nicholas Terrace was dismantled as the best as can be determined sometime around 1935-1937 when excavations were made to the grounds on the north side of St. Nicholas Terrace, former site of the Bowker Library, as shoring was being added to the library.

The New York Landmarks Preservation Commission made the North Campus Quadrangle buildings and the College Gates official landmarks in 1981. The buildings in the Quadrangle were put on the State and National Register of Historic Places in 1984. In the summer of 2006, the historic gates on Convent Avenue were restored.

Postwar buildings

Steinman Hall, which houses the School of Engineering, was erected in 1962 on the north end of the campus, on the site of the Bowker Library and the Drill Hall to replace the facilities in Compton Hall and Goethals Hall, and was named for David Barnard Steinman (CCNY Class of 1906), a well known civil engineer and bridge designer.

The Administration Building was erected in 1963 on the North Campus across from Wingate Hall. It houses the college's administration offices, including the President's, Provost's and the Registrar's offices. It was originally intended as a warehouse to store the huge number of records and transcripts of students since 1847. The first floor houses the admissions office and the registrar's office, while the upper floors house the offices of the president and provost. The first floor of the Administration Building was given a postmodern renovation in 2004. In early 2007, the Administration Building was formally named the Howard E. Wille Administration Building, in honor of Howard E. Wille, class of 1955, a distinguished alumnus and philanthropist.

The Marshak Science Building was completed in 1971 on the site of the former Jasper Oval, an open space previously used as a football field. The building was named after Robert Marshak, renowned physicist and president of CCNY (1970–1979). The Marshak building houses all science labs and adjoins the Mahoney Gymnasium and its athletic facilities including a swimming pool and tennis courts.

In the 1970s, construction of the massive North Academic Center (NAC) was initiated. It was completed in 1984, and replaced Lewisohn Stadium and Klapper Hall. The NAC building houses hundreds of classrooms, two cafeterias, the Cohen Library, student lounges and centers, administrative offices, and a number of computer installations. Designed by architect John Carl Warnecke, the building has received criticism for its lack of design and outsize scale in comparison to the surrounding neighborhood. Within the NAC, a student lounge space was created outside the campus bookstore, and murals celebrating the history of the campus were painted on the doors of the undergraduate Student Government. Founded in 1869, it claims to be the oldest continuously operating student government organization in the country.

South Campus

In 1953, CCNY bought the campus of the Manhattanville College of the Sacred Heart (which, on a 1913 map, was shown as The Convent of the Sacred Heart), which added a south section to the campus. This expanded the campus to include many of the buildings in the area between 140th Street to 130th Street, from St. Nicholas Terrace in the east to Amsterdam Avenue in the west. Former buildings of the Manhattanville College campus to be used by CCNY were renamed for City College's purposes: Stieglitz Hall; Downer Hall; Wagner Hall, the prominent Finley Student Center, which contained the very active Buttenweiser Lounge; Eisner Hall; Park Gym; Mott Hall; and others.

As a result of this expansion, the South Campus of CCNY primarily contained the liberal arts classes and departments of the college. The North Campus, also as a result of this expansion, mostly housed classes and departments for the sciences and engineering, as well as Klapper Hall (School of Education), and the Administration Building.

In 1957, a new library building was erected in the middle of the campus, near 135th Street on the South Campus, and named Cohen Library, after Morris Raphael Cohen, an alumnus (Class of 1900) and celebrated professor of philosophy at the college from 1912 to 1938. When the Cohen Library moved to the North Academic Complex in the early 1980s, the structure was renamed the 'Y' building, and housed offices, supplies, the mail room, etc. The building was eventually gutted and renovated to become the home of the School of Architecture in 2009 (see below).

In the 1970s, many of the old buildings of the South Campus were demolished, some that had been used by the Academy of the Sacred Heart. The buildings remaining on the South Campus at this time were the Cohen Library (later moved into the North Academic Center), Park Gym (now the Structural Biology Research Center (NYSBC)), Eisner Hall (built in 1941 by Manhattanville College of the Sacred Heart as a library, later remodeled and housed CCNY's Art Department and named for the chairman of the Board of Higher Education in the 1930s), the Schiff House (former President's residence, now a child care center), and Mott Hall (formerly the English Department, now a New York City Department of Education primary school).

Some of the buildings that were demolished at that time were Finley Hall (housed The Finley Student Center, student activities center, originally built in 1888–1890 as Manhattanville Academy's main building, and purchased in 1953 by City College), Wagner Hall, (which housed various social science and liberal arts departments and classes, originally built as a dormitory for Manhattanville Academy, and was named in honor of Robert F. Wagner Sr., member of the Class of 1898, who represented New York State for 23 years in the United States Senate), Stieglitz Hall, and Downer Hall, among others.

New South Campus buildings
Several new buildings were erected on the South Campus, including Aaron Davis Hall in 1981 and the Herman Goldman sports field in 1993. In August 2006, the college completed the construction of a 600-bed dormitory, called "The Towers." There are plans to rename The Towers after a distinguished alumnus or donor.

The building that formerly housed Cohen Library, the "Y" building, became the new home for the School of Architecture, with the renovation headed by architect Rafael Viñoly. Near the 133rd Street gate, the Herman Goldman sports field was eliminated in favor of two new scientific education and research facilities.

In 2007, two new buildings had been proposed for the South Campus site by the Dormitory Authority of the State of New York (DASNY). One was a four-story Science Building, to serve as an adjunct to the Marshak Science Building on the North Campus, and the other was a six-story Advanced Science Research Center (ASRC).

Designed by Kohn Pedersen Fox Associates, a pair of new buildings on the site of the Herman Goldman sports field: the Advanced Science Research Center (ASRC), serving visiting scientists and the whole CUNY system; and the Center for Discovery and Innovation. The buildings are linked by a tunnel. In total, these two buildings 400,000 square feet of laboratories, offices, an auditorium, and meeting rooms.

Demolished buildings

Downtown campus

City College's original campus, the Free Academy Building, existed from 1849 to 1907. The building was designed by James Renwick, Jr. and was located at Lexington Avenue and 23rd Street in Gramercy Park. According to some sources, it was the first Gothic Revival college building on the East Coast. Renwick's building was demolished in 1928, and replaced in 1930 with a 16-story structure that is part of the present-day Baruch College campus.

Lewisohn Stadium

In the early 1900s, after most of the Gothic campus had been built, CCNY President John H. Finley wanted the college to have a stadium to replace the existing inadequate facilities. New York City did not provide the money needed to build a stadium, but donated two city blocks south of the campus which were open park land. In 1912, businessman and philanthropist Adolph Lewisohn donated $75,000 for the stadium's construction and Finley commissioned architect Arnold W. Brunner to design Lewisohn Stadium.

Lewisohn Stadium was built as a 6,000-seat stadium, with thousands more seats available on the infield during concerts, and was dedicated on May 29, 1915, two years after Dr. Finley had left his post at the college. College graduation services were held in Lewisohn for many years, with the last graduation held in 1973 shortly before it was demolished. Deep under the grandstand seats was the college rifle range, used by ROTC students for basic handling of firearms.

Other demolished buildings
A separate library building originally planned in 1912 for the campus was never built but ground was broken on March 25, 1927, for a free-standing library to be built on St. Nicholas Terrace, between St. Nicholas and 141st Streets. Only 1/5 of the original library plan was constructed at a cost of $850,000, far above the $150,000 alumni had collected to establish a library at the original Amsterdam Avenue and 140th Street site. The Bowker/Alumni Library stood at the present site of the Steinman Engineering building until 1957.

The Hebrew Orphan Asylum was erected in 1884 on Amsterdam Avenue between 136th and 138th Streets, and was designed by William H. Hume. It was already there when City College moved to upper Manhattan. When it closed in the 1940s, the building was used by City College to house members of the U.S. Armed Forces assigned to the Army Specialized Training Program (ASTP). From 1946 to 1955, it was used as a dormitory, library, and classroom space for the college. It was called "Army Hall" until it was demolished in 1955 and 1956.

In 1946, CCNY purchased a former Episcopal orphanage on 135th Street and Convent Avenue (North campus), and renamed it Klapper Hall, after Paul Klapper (Class of 1904) Professor and the Dean of School of Education and who was later the first president of Queens College/CUNY (1937–1952). Klapper Hall was red brick in Georgian style and it served until 1983 as home of the School of Education.

Campus location
The college is located between West 130th and West 141st Streets in Manhattan, along Convent Avenue and St. Nicholas Terrace, between Amsterdam and St. Nicholas Avenues. The campus is served by the following transportation:
The south end of the station is closer to CCNY and is served by the college's bus service on weekdays.
MTA Regional Bus Operations'  routes and campus shuttle buses

Academics
The City College of New York is organized into five schools, plus the Macaulay Honors College. The five schools of the City College of New York are The Colin Powell School for Civic and Global Leadership, The Bernard and Anne Spitzer School of Architecture, The School of Education, The Grove School of Engineering, and The CUNY School of Medicine. In addition to the five schools, there's the Division of Humanities and Arts, the Division of Science, and the Division of Interdisciplinary Studies at the Center of for Worker Education.
The college offers the Bachelor of Arts (B.A.), Bachelor of Science (B.S.), Bachelor of Science in education (B.S. Ed.), Bachelor of Engineering (B.E.), Bachelor of Fine Arts (B.F.A.), Bachelor of Architecture (B.Arch.) degrees at the undergraduate level, and the Master of Arts (M.A.), Master of Science (M.S.), Master of Science in education (M.S.Ed.), Master of Engineering (M.E.), Master of Fine Arts (M.F.A.), Master of Architecture (M.Arch.), Master of Landscape Architecture (M.L.A.), Master of Urban Planning (M.U.P.), Master of Professional Studies (M.P.S.), Master of Public Administration (M.P.A.), Doctor of Philosophy (PhD) degrees at the graduate level.

For the fall 2016 entering class of freshman, the average SAT score was 1260/1600 and the average high school GPA was 90/100%.

Rankings
For the 2022 - 2023 academic year, the City College of New York achieved earned the following national rankings:

ARWU: 107 - 127 

Forbes: 124

THE/WSJ: 212 

US News & World: 151 

Washington Monthly: 206

QS: 201 - 250 

CWUR: 108

MONEY: 113

Physics 
The City College of New York has had a long and distinguished history in physics. Three of its alumni went on to become Nobel laureates in physics: Robert Hofstadter in 1961, Arno Penzias in 1978, and Leon Lederman in 1988. Albert Einstein gave the first of his series of United States lectures at the City College of New York in 1921. Other distinguished alumni and past faculty in the field are Mark Zemansky, Clarence Zener, Mitchell Feigenbaum, Myriam Sarachik and Leonard Susskind. Current faculty include Robert Alfano and Michio Kaku.

Research

Advanced Science Research Center
CCNY hosts a research center focusing on nanotechnology, structural biology, photonics, neuroscience and environmental sciences.

CUNY Dominican Studies Institute
Part of CCNY's Colin Powell School for Civic and Global Leadership, the CUNY Dominican Studies Institute is the nation's only university-based research center devoted to "the history of the Dominican Republic and people of Dominican descent in the United States and across the wider Dominican diaspora."

College seal and medal logo
The design of the three-faced college seal has its roots in the 19th century, when Professor Charles Anthon was inspired by views of Janus, the Roman god of beginnings, whose two faces connect the past and the future. He broadened this image of Janus into three faces to show the student, and consequently, knowledge, developing from childhood through youth into maturity.

The seal was redesigned for the college's Centennial Medal in 1947 by Albert P. d'Andrea (class of 1918). Professor d'Andrea, having immigrated from Benevento, Italy, in 1901, joined the faculty immediately after graduation and was Professor of Art and Chairman of the Art Department from 1948 to 1968.

In 2003, the college decided to create a logo distinct from its seal, with the stylized text "the City College of New York."

Athletics
Olympic gold medalist Henry Wittenberg was co-captain of the CCNY wrestling team in 1939 during his undergraduate studies. After participating in two Olympics, he then taught wrestling at CCNY. In 1977, he was inducted into the National Wrestling Hall of Fame.

CCNY is the only team in men's college basketball history to win both the National Invitation Tournament and the NCAA Tournament in the same year (1950). However, this accomplishment was overshadowed by the CCNY point shaving scandal in which seven CCNY basketball players were arrested in 1951 for taking money from gamblers to affect the outcome of games. The scandal led to the decline of CCNY from a national powerhouse in Division I basketball to a member of Division III, and damaged the national profile of college basketball in general.

From 1934 until 1941, future NFL Hall of Famer Benny Friedman was the football coach at City College.

In 1938, future four-time Olympican Daniel Bukantz was the intercollegiate foil champion. Future Olympian James Strauch fenced for CCNY, graduating in 1942. In 1948, future Olympian Abram Cohen was a member of the NCAA Champion CCNY team.  That same year future five-time Olympian Albert Axelrod was U.S. Intercollegiate Fencing Association and NCAA Champion in foil. Harold Goldsmith, a future three-time Olympian, won the 1952 NCAA foil championship while at CCNY.

The college currently fields seven men's teams (Baseball, Basketball, Cross Country, Indoor/Outdoor Track and Field, Soccer, Volleyball) and seven women's varsity athletic teams (Basketball, Cross Country, Fencing, Indoor/Outdoor Track and Field, Soccer, Volleyball). The department also offers a men's and women's Lacrosse clubs. The Beavers have won 1 NCAA Division I championship (Men's Basketball) and over 70 City University of New York Athletic Conference (CUNYAC) Championships since 1966. The Beavers have won 2 Division III Eastern College Athletic Conference (ECAC) Championships in the program's history: Men's Volleyball and Women's Basketball. The Beavers also have a successful history in NCAA Division III Track and Field. The Lady Beavers have placed within the top 3 multiple times, 5 times for Indoor Women, 2 times for Outdoor Women. The Men's and Women's Track teams combined have over 25 All-Americans since 1980.

Art

The City College of New York and its resident art collection were founded in 1847. The collection contains roughly one thousand eight hundred works of art ranging from the historical to the contemporary. There were two major points in the college's history when most of the artwork in the collection was obtained; the first was at the founding of the institution and the second was in the 1970s when much of the campus underwent renovation and expansion. Also a larger portion of the collection was obtained through donations and Percent for Art, a program established in 1982 to offer New York City agencies the opportunity to acquire or commission artwork for properties owned by the City of New York.

There is currently no art museum at City College, thus much of the collection is not on view for the student population or public. The collection includes works by Edwin Howland Blashfield, Walter Pach, Charles Alston, Raphael Soyer, Louis Lozowick, Stephen Parrish, Paul Adolphe Rajon, Mariano Fortuny, Marilyn Bridges, Lucien Clergue, Elliott Erwitt, Andreas Feininger, Harold Feinstein, Larry Fink, Sally Gall, Ralph Gibson, Jerome Liebling, Robert Mapplethorpe, Mary Ellen Mark, Joel Meyerowitz, Dorothy Norman and Gilles Peress.

The drawings, prints and photos which comprise the collection are housed within the libraries as a part of the City College archive, where individuals can make appointments to view the works. Some notable works from the collection include several Keith Haring prints and Edward Curtis's The North American Indian.

Student involvement with the collection is minimum but there is some. At the moment graduate students in museum studies are working to develop an inventory of the collection. There are times when they host small exhibitions of works in the collection but there is no allotted gallery space for this. Undergraduate students mostly interact with the collection through their classes; aside from that most of their experiences with this collection come from the public sculptures around campus.

Transportation 
The  train serves the college at 137th Street-City College, the  trains at 145th Street, and the  trains at 135th Street (local stop). The  buses stop on Broadway while the  stop closer to the school at Amsterdam Avenue. The  stops on St Nicholas Avenue.

In media
 The central character in Woody Allen's short story "The Kugelmass Episode" is a lovesick City College humanities professor.
 In World of Our Fathers, Irving Howe writes about the intellectual life of Jewish immigrants' children attending City College.

Notable people

See also 

 State University of New York
 Cluster Fellowship
 Manhattanville College
 Mid-InfraRed Technologies for Health and the Environment
 Rosenberg/Humphrey Program in Public Policy fellowship
 Timeline of New York City
 1949–50 CCNY Beavers men's basketball team

Notes

References

Further reading
 Bederson, Benjamin, "The Physical Tourist: Physics and New York City", Phys. perspect. 5 (2003) 87–121 Birkha¨ user Verlag, Basel, 2003. Cf. p. 103–107 &c. regarding CCNY Physics.
 Bender, Thomas. New York Intellect: A History of Intellectual Life in New York City, from 1750 to the Beginnings of Our Own Time, Knopf, 1987. 
 Chen, David W., "Dreams Stall as CUNY, New York City's Engine of Mobility, Sputters", The New York Times, May 28, 2016
 Howe, Irving. A Margin of Hope: An Intellectual Autobiography, Harcourt Brace Jovanovich, 1982. . Cf. Chapter 3, "City College and Beyond", pp. 61–89
 Pearson, Paul David. The City College of New York: 150 years of academic architecture, 1997.
 Roff, Sandra S., et al. From the Free Academy to Cuny: Illustrating Public Higher Education in New York City, 1847–1997, 2000.
 Rudy, Willis. College of the City of New York 1847–1947, The City College Press, 1949. Reprinted in 1977 by the Arno Press.
 Traub, James. City on a Hill: Testing the American Dream at City College, Addison-Wesley: 1994.
 Van Nort, Sydney C. The City College of New York, Arcadia Press, February 2007. .
  The College of the City of New York: Annual Register for 1920–1, City College of New York, December 1920

External links

 
 CCNY Athletics website
 

 
1847 establishments in New York (state)
Educational institutions established in 1847
Hamilton Heights, Manhattan
School buildings on the National Register of Historic Places in Manhattan
Universities and colleges in Manhattan
Collegiate Gothic architecture in New York City
Education in Harlem